"No te Mentía" is the first single of Ednita Nazario's album Real (2007). This song deals with a warning from one woman to her beloved, whom she did not will endure "no more".

Music video
The music video was recorded in Argentina in November 2007. The worldwide premiere was in "No te Duermas" TV show of Telemundo.

 No Te Mentia - Official Music Video

Charts

References

2007 singles
2007 songs
Ednita Nazario songs
Songs written by Claudia Brant
Songs written by Jorge Luis Piloto
Sony BMG Norte singles
2000s ballads
Pop ballads